Colin Allen Hart-Leverton KC (born 10 May 1936) is a British former lawyer and Liberal Party politician. He lives in north west London

Background
Hart-Leverton was born the son of Monty Hart-Leverton and Betty Simmonds. He was educated at Stowe School. In 1990 he married Kathi Jo Davidson.

Professional career
Hart-Leverton qualified in 1957 as a Member of the Institute of Taxation, the youngest ever to have qualified. He was called to the Bar by Middle Temple in 1957, again the youngest to have ever qualified. He was the Prosecuting Counsel at the Central Criminal Court from 1974–79. He was appointed a Deputy Circuit Judge in 1975. He was Attorney-at-Law at the Turks and Caicos Islands in the Caribbean in 1976. In 1979 he became a Queen's Counsel and served as a Recorder of the Crown Court from 1979–2001. He was also a Professional pianist with various well-known jazz bands.

Political career
Hart-Leverton joined the Liberal Party and was Chairman of  Highgate Young Liberals and an Executive member of London League of Young Liberals. At the age of 22 he was Liberal candidate for the Bristol West division at the 1959 General Election. He was Liberal candidate for the Walthamstow West division at the 1964 General Election. He did not stand for parliament again.

Electoral record

References

1936 births
Liberal Party (UK) parliamentary candidates
People educated at Stowe School
Members of the Middle Temple
Living people
Place of birth missing (living people)
English King's Counsel
20th-century King's Counsel
21st-century King's Counsel